Tropical Storm Ana was the first named storm of the 2003 Atlantic hurricane season. A pre-season storm, it developed initially as a subtropical cyclone from a non-tropical low on April 20 to the west of Bermuda. Tropical Storm Ana turned east-northeastward, steadily weakening due to wind shear and an approaching cold front, and on April 24 it became an extratropical cyclone. The storm brushed Bermuda with light rain, and its remnants produced precipitation in the Azores and the United Kingdom. Swells generated by the storm capsized a boat along the Florida coastline, causing two fatalities.

Meteorological history

Ana was the earliest subtropical or tropical storm to form in an Atlantic hurricane season since 1978. The trough, which extended from the gale center to Hispaniola, brought a plume of moisture northward from the Caribbean Sea into the circulation, which caused heavy rainfall in Puerto Rico. The non-tropical low tracked generally northward, with a ridge to its east and west, and on April 19 the system began producing sporadic convection near its center; early that day, satellite imagery indicated the presence of a tight inner core of winds. After turning to the northwest, it looped southeastward and gradually became separated from the surface frontal system, due to the deepening of the upper-level trough over the system. Operationally, the subtropical cyclone was not classified by the National Hurricane Center until 21 hours later.

The subtropical storm tracked east-southeastward and continued to organize, and by late on April 20 an upper-level warm core was present over the system. Based on its organization, Ana is estimated to have become a tropical storm by 0000 UTC on April 21. Operationally, the cyclone was first classified by the National Hurricane Center around this time, when it was considered a subtropical cyclone. Strong upper-level wind shear removed much of the convection, though a small area of thunderstorms persisted near the center. The storm became completely separated from the upper-level system, and the cyclone re-organized, developing an eye feature late on April 21. Embedded within the flow of a cyclone to its north, Ana continued eastward, and early on April 22 the wind shear again removed the convection from the center. Convection waxed and waned throughout the day, and by April 23 the circulation had deteriorated in organization. After turning to the northeast, the circulation center merged with an approaching cold front on April 24, and Tropical Storm Ana completed the transition into an extratropical cyclone. The extratropical storm accelerated east-northeastward before losing its identity within the frontal zone on April 27 southeast of the Azores.

Impact

Prior to the development of Ana, the government of Bermuda issued a gale warning for the island. Upon its classification by the National Hurricane Center, a tropical storm warning was issued for Bermuda. Meandering near the island for several days while developing, the storm dropped  of precipitation in a six-day period at the Bermuda International Airport. Winds on the island did not reach tropical storm force. Swells from the storm impacted the coast of Florida. The combination of the swells and an outgoing tide caused a boat to capsize in Jupiter Inlet on April 20; two of its occupants drowned, and the other two were rescued. As an extratropical storm, the remnants of Ana dropped  of precipitation in the city of Ponta Delgada in the Azores. Moisture from the remnants of Ana also produced beneficial rainfall in the United Kingdom.

See also

Other storms of the same name
List of Azores hurricanes
List of Bermuda hurricanes
List of off-season Atlantic hurricanes

References

External links

 

Ana
Ana (2003)
Ana (2003)
Ana (2003)
Ana (2003)
Ana (2003)
Ana (2003)
Ana